The 1999–2000 Vyshcha Liha season was the 9th since its establishment. FC Dynamo Kyiv were the defending champions.

Teams

Promotions
Chornomorets Odessa, the runners-up of the 1998–99 Ukrainian First League  – (returning after absence of a season)

Note: the 1998–99 Ukrainian First League was won by the second team of Dynamo Kyiv, FC Dynamo-2 Kyiv, which could not be promoted. The third placed team FC Torpedo Zaporizhia was originally also had to be promoted, but due to its financial situation it filed for bankruptcy. Because of the situation with Torpedo, the Professional Football League of Ukraine scheduled a playoff game which was won by Prykarpattia.

Location

Managers

Managerial changes

League table

Results

Top goalscorers

Notable Transfers
Serhii Rebrov, FC Dynamo Kyiv to Tottenham Hotspur F.C.
Hennadiy Moroz, FC Kryvbas Kryvyi Rih to FC Dynamo Kyiv

External links
ukrsoccerhistory.com - source of information

Ukrainian Premier League seasons
1999–2000 in Ukrainian association football leagues
Ukra